Hazel Malone Management was a British-based talent agency. It represented some of the top British actors and actresses from the 1960s to the 1980s. The agency was established in 1961, and was run by Hazel Malone herself until her death on April 2, 1995.

Background
Prior to establishing her agency, Hazel Malone had worked with her sisters, Rona and Muriel Knight, running a dance academy in Chiswick. One of their first major projects was forming the singing/dancing group the “Corona Babes” in the 1930s. She later married Danny Malone and had one son with him, Cavan Malone.

In 1961, after returning from a world wide tour with her music group, Hazel established a talent agency for adults and all the young actors and actresses who had completed their education at the Corona Academy Stage School (which was run by her sister, Rona Knight). The agency quickly flourished, and eventually Hazel moved into the West End with her headquarters based in the Clarendon House on 11 Clifford Street in London. She also had other office locations, including Park Lane in Stanhope Gate W1. Hazel occasionally hosted small private dinner parties at her personal residence, located on 89 Riverview Gardens in Barnes, which was attended by her selected clients. She also occasionally did business with other talent agents such as  Barry Brown, Dennis Selinger, and Felix De Wolfe. 

From the 1960s to 1980s, Hazel’s talent agency was one of the most prosperous in the United Kingdom, United States, and Australia. She ran her agency right up to the time of her death in 1995.

Notable Clients

Actors

 Robin Askwith
 David Bowie
 Jeremy Bulloch
 Larry Dann
Barry Evans
 Kenneth Gilbert
 Frazer Hines
 Malcom McDowell
 Richard O’Sullivan
 Richard Palmer
 Robin Stewart
 Michael Summerton
Dennis Waterman

Actresses

 Francesca Annis
Bridget Brice
 Julie Dawn Cole
 Karan David
 Lynne Frederick
 Judy Geeson
 Sally Geeson
 Susan George
 Candace Glendenning
 Lorna Henderson
 Laraine Humphrys
Diane Keen
 Janet Key
Mary Land
 Claire Marshall
 Ania Marson
 Judy Matheson
 Mary Maude
 Margaret McCourt
 Françoise Pascal
 Luan Peters
 Adrienne Posta
 Carol White
Polly Williams
 Seretta Wilson

References

British talent agents